Egertonia is an extinct genus of prehistoric bony fish. The earliest occurrences of the genus in the fossil record are from the Late Cretaceous of Madagascar and India.

See also

 Prehistoric fish
 List of prehistoric bony fish

References

Prehistoric bony fish genera
Cretaceous bony fish
Late Cretaceous fish
Fossils of India
Fish of Madagascar
Extinct animals of Madagascar